Come Fly with Me is the fourteenth studio album by American singer Frank Sinatra, released in 1958.

In 2000 it was voted number 616 in Colin Larkin's All Time Top 1000 Albums.

Background
Sinatra's first collaboration with arranger/conductor Billy May, Come Fly with Me was designed as a musical trip around the world. Sammy Cahn and Jimmy Van Heusen wrote the title track at Sinatra's request.

May would arrange two other Capitol albums for Sinatra, Come Dance with Me! (1958) and Come Swing with Me! (1961).

In his autobiography All You Need Is Ears, producer George Martin wrote of having visited the Capitol Tower during the recording sessions for the album.  According to Martin's book, Sinatra expressed intense dislike for the album cover upon being first shown a mock-up by producer Voyle Gilmore, suggesting it looked like an advertisement for TWA.

The album reached #1 on the Billboard album chart in its second week, and remained at the top for five weeks. At the inaugural Grammy Awards Come Fly with Me was nominated for the Grammy Award for Album of the Year, and it was inducted into the Grammy Hall of Fame in 2004.

Though recorded simultaneously in true stereo alongside a distinct mono mix, "Come Fly with Me" was released to record stores in 1958 in monaural only, a standard practice by Capitol records at the time.  The label finally released the stereo version in 1961.

Track listing

Personnel
 Frank Sinatra - vocals
 Billy May - arranger, conductor

Tracks 1, 2, 10, 11, 12:

Mannie Klein, Conrad Gozzo, Shorty Sherock, Mickey Mangano (tpt); Ed Kusby, Joe Howard, Murray McEachern, Si Zentner (tbn); J.H. Washburne (tuba); Harry Klee, Wilbur Schwartz, Buddy Collette, Jules Jacob, Fred Falensby (wwd); Felix Slatkin, Paul Shure, Mischa Russell, Marshall Sosson, Harold Dicterow, Dan Lube, Alex Murray, David Frisina, Lou Raderman, Jacques Gasselin, Ben Gill, Paul Nero (vln); David Sterkin, Paul Robyn, Alvin Dinkin, Alex Neiman (via); Eleanor Slatkin, Edgard Lustgarten, Elizabeth Greenschpoon, Armand Kaproff (vie); Verlye Mills (harp); Bill Miller (p); Al Hendrickson (g); Joe Mondragon (b); Alvin Stoller (d); Frank Flynn (perc).

Tracks 3, 6, 7:

Mannie Klein, Conrad Gozzo, Shorty Sherock, Pete Candoli (tpt); Si Zentner, Murray McEachern, Tommy Pederson, Joe Howard (tbn); Skeets Herfurt, Buddy Collette, Ted Nash, Jules Jacob, Fred Falensby (wwd); Verlye Mills (harp); Bill Miller (p); Al Hendrickson (g); Joe Mondragon (b); J.H. Washburne (tuba); Alvin Stoller (d); Frank Flynn (perc).

Tracks 4, 5, 8, 9:

Si Zentner, Murray McEachern, Joe Howard (tbn); Vincent DeRosa (fr-h); J.H. Washburne (tuba); Skeets Herfurt, Wilbur Schwartz, Jules Kinsler, Jules Jacob, Fred Falensby (wwd); Felix Slatkin, Paul Shure, Mischa Russell, Marshall Sosson, Harold Dicterow, Dan Lube, Alex Murray, David Frisina, Lou Raderman, Jacques Gasselin, Gerald Vinci, Paul Nero (vln); David Sterkin, Paul Robyn, Alvin Dinkin, Alex Neiman (via); Eleanor Slatkin, Edgar Lustgarten, Ray Kramer, Armand Kaproff (vie); Verlye Mills (harp); Bill Miller (p); Al Hendrickson (g); Joe Mondragon (b); Alvin Stoller (d).

"On the Road to Mandalay"

"On the Road to Mandalay", based on Rudyard Kipling's poem "Mandalay" was replaced on some versions of the album after the Kipling family objected to Sinatra's interpretation. When the album was released in the United Kingdom, it was replaced by "It Happened in Monterey" on original mono releases and "French Foreign Legion" on stereo copies, while the song "Chicago" was used in other parts of the British Commonwealth. Sinatra sang the song in Australia, during a concert tour in 1959, and relayed the story of the Kipling family objection to the song and how the Australian release of Come Fly with Me came to contain "Chicago". "Mandalay" was eventually restored on the 1984 UK re-pressing, and has been included on all subsequent releases.

References

Frank Sinatra albums
Capitol Records albums
1958 albums
Albums produced by Voyle Gilmore
Albums arranged by Billy May
Albums conducted by Billy May
Albums recorded at Capitol Studios
Concept albums